Titanebo is a genus of North American running crab spiders that was first described by Carl Eduard Adolph Gerstaecker in 1933.

Species
 it contains fourteen species, found only in Mexico and the United States:
Titanebo albocaudatus (Schick, 1965) – USA, Mexico
Titanebo andreaannae (Schick, 1965) – USA
Titanebo californicus Gertsch, 1933 – USA
Titanebo cantralli (Sauer & Platnick, 1972) – USA
Titanebo creosotis (Schick, 1965) – USA
Titanebo dispar (Schick, 1965) – USA
Titanebo dondalei (Sauer, 1968) – USA
Titanebo macyi Gertsch, 1933 (type) – USA
Titanebo magnificus Chamberlin & Ivie, 1942 – USA
Titanebo mexicanus (Banks, 1898) – USA, Mexico
Titanebo oblongus (Simon, 1895) – USA
Titanebo parabolis (Schick, 1965) – USA
Titanebo redneri (Cokendolpher, 1978) – USA
Titanebo texanus Gertsch, 1933 – USA

See also
 List of Philodromidae species

References

Araneomorphae genera
Philodromidae
Spiders of North America